The C&C 38 is a series of Canadian sailboats, that were all designed by C&C Design and first built in 1973.

Production
The boats were built by C&C Yachts in Canada, but are now out of production.

Design
The C&C 38 series are all a small recreational keelboats, built predominantly of fiberglass, with wood trim. They all have masthead sloop rigs and internally-mounted spade-type rudders.

The series includes three designs, the C&C 38 (subsequently called the 38-1 to differentiate it from the later models), the 38-2 and the 38-3. The latter boat was an entirely new design.

The 38-2 was used as the basis for the Landfall 38, built with the same hull shape, but a shorter keel and rig, plus a different interior.

Variants
C&C 38 (also later called the 38-1)
This model was introduced in 1973, with production ending in 1975. The boat is fitted with a Universal Atomic 4  gasoline engine. The boat has a PHRF racing average handicap of 14 with a high of 123 and low of 102.
C&C 38-2
This model was introduced in 1975, with 98 examples built. It was a development of the 38-1, optimized by C&C Chief of Design Robert W. Ball for International Offshore Rule racing. The standard keel version displaces  and carries  of lead ballast. The boat is fitted with a Universal Atomic 4  gasoline engine. The boat has a PHRF racing average handicap of 114 with a high of 117 and low of 112. In 1978 the design was developed into the Baltic 37.

C&C 38-3
This model was a completely new design, introduced in 1985. The boat is fitted with a Japanese Yanmar YHM35F diesel engine. The standard keel boat has a PHRF racing average handicap of 105 with a high of 114 and low of 102. The wing keel version has an average handicap of 108 with a high of 111 and low of 108. The centreboard version has an average handicap of 117 with a high of 126 and low of 117.

See also
List of sailing boat types

Related development
Baltic 37
Landfall 38

Similar sailboats
Alajuela 38
Catalina 38
Catalina 375
Columbia 38
Eagle 38
Farr 38
Hunter 38
Hunter 380
Hunter 386
Sabre 38
Shannon 38
Yankee 38

References

External links
 Original Factory Brochure - C&C 38-2, 2 page, B&W
 Original Factory Brochure - C&C 38-2, 4 page, B&W
 Original Factory Brochure - C&C 38-2, 2 page, colour
 Original Factory Brochure - C&C 38-3, 16 page, B&W
 Original Factory Brochure - C&C 38-3, 2 page, colour
 Original Factory Brochure - C&C 38-3, 8 page, colour
 Original Factory Standard & Optional Equipment - C&C 38-3, 4 page, B&W

Keelboats
1970s sailboat type designs
Sailing yachts
Sailboat type designs by Robert W. Ball
Sailboat type designs by C&C Design
Sailboat types built by C&C Yachts